Jarrad Oakley-Nicholls (born 9 February 1988) is an Australian rules footballer currently playing with the East Perth Football Club in the West Australian Football League (WAFL).

He was pick 8 overall in the 2005 draft, from East Perth in the West Australian Football League.  He first made his AFL debut at the annual "Dreamtime at the 'G" game in 2006. He always struggled with his health and fitness and didn't ever have a pre-season due to injury.

Oakley-Nicholls was delisted by Richmond at the end of the 2009 season after playing only 13 games during his four years at the club. In the 2009 rookie draft Oakley-Nicholls was drafted by the West Coast Eagles.

In 2010, expectations were higher but he struggled with a groin injury and failed to play a game.

Again in 2011 he failed to get a game and was delisted by the West Coast Eagles in October 2011.

External links

East Perth Football Club players
Richmond Football Club players
1988 births
Living people
Indigenous Australians from Western Australia
Indigenous Australian players of Australian rules football
Australian rules footballers from Western Australia
Coburg Football Club players